The 2004 Plymouth City Council election was held on 10 June 2004 to elect members of Plymouth City Council in England. This was on the same day as the other local elections. One third of the council was up for election and the Labour Party remained in control of the council.

Overall results

|-
| colspan=2 style="text-align: right; margin-right: 1em" | Total
| style="text-align: right;" | 19
| colspan=5 |
| style="text-align: right;" | 63,833
| style="text-align: right;" |

Ward results

Budshead

Compton

Devonport

Efford and Lipson

Eggbuckland

Ham

Honicknowle

Moor View

Peverell

Plympton Chaddlewood

Plympton Erle

Plympton St Mary

Plymstock Dunstone

Plymstock Radford

St Budeaux

St Peter and the Waterfront

Southway

Stoke

Sutton and Mount Gould

References

2004 English local elections
May 2004 events in the United Kingdom
2004
2000s in Devon